Jonathan Ernest Gadsby  (1 November 1953 – 12 December 2015) was a New Zealand television comedian and writer, most well known for his role in the comedy series McPhail and Gadsby co-starring alongside David McPhail. He died of cancer aged 62.

Life and career
Gadsby was born in Derbyshire, England, and went to school in Invercargill when his family moved to New Zealand. He studied law at the University of Otago, leaving in his final year to work at Radio Otago. He entered television with David McPhail in the comedy A Week of It in 1977, before the pair went on to the successful and long-running 80s political satire McPhail and Gadsby.

Gadsby appeared in numerous television programmes, several films, and wrote more than 20 books, mainly for children. He wrote for The New Zealand Herald, Metro and The Listener, and performed corporate voicing. He was the founding editor of Christchurch magazine Avenues.

In 2008, he received a conviction for drink-driving, after being stopped at a checkpoint in December 2006. In 2011, he was convicted of his fourth drink-driving charge, having been stopped with a breath alcohol reading 2.5 times in excess of the legal limit.

He died in Christchurch on 12 December 2015 from cancer.

Honours and awards
McPhail and Gadsby won the "Best Television Entertainment Programme" award in 1981, and David McPhail and Gadsby were jointly voted the "Best Television Entertainer". In the 1992 New Year Honours, Gadsby was awarded the Queen's Service Medal for public services. Gadsby, David McPhail and A. K. Grant, were named best writers at the 1996 Film and Television Awards, for the series Letter to Blanchy.

Work

Television
 A Week of It (1977)
 McPhail and Gadsby (1980–1987, 1997–98)
 Issues (1991)
 More Issues (1992)
 Letter to Blanchy (1996–1997)
 Xena: Warrior Princess (2000)
 Intrepid Journeys – Myanmar (Series 2, No 14; 2004)

Film
 1980 Nutcase
 1984 Second Time Lucky
 1984 The Bounty
 2008 Sisterhood

Writing
 1984 Book of Beasts
 1998 Dave and the Giant Pickle (Illustrator)
 1989 The Dictionary of Wimps with Allan Grant and David McPhail
 1995 Martin's Gang and the Ogre (Tui turbo)
 1995 Griselda Marmalade Forsythe
 1997 The Fantail and the Weka
 1998 The song of Nelson Mandela : the freedom to be
 2000 The Trough
 2001 Toi Toi Valley: The Big Black Boulder
 2001 Toi Toi Valley: The Scary Scaly Visitor
 2004 Bumblebee Pie
 2005 Zoo, The: Feeding
 2005 Zoo, The: Babies
 2000 Kapai books

Theatre
 2008 Letter to Blanchy : Stir Crazy (with David McPhail)

References

External links
 
 Avenues magazine Editors Corner
 

1953 births
2015 deaths
New Zealand comedians
New Zealand male comedians
New Zealand male novelists
People from Christchurch
English emigrants to New Zealand
New Zealand satirists
Recipients of the Queen's Service Medal
20th-century New Zealand novelists
21st-century New Zealand novelists
University of Otago alumni
People from Derbyshire
20th-century New Zealand male writers
21st-century New Zealand male writers